The 2022 Rugby League Ireland (RLI) season was a suite of rugby league competitions played on the island of Ireland administered by Rugby League Ireland. Featuring a two division men's Premiership and Championship, as well as a two game Women's Premiership, the season saw the Dublin City Exiles and Banbridge Broncos remain undefeated in their respective divisions to take home the title.

RLI Premiership 
Three teams contested the RLI Premiership, with the Dublin City Exiles winning the title with a perfect 6–0 record across the season.

Teams

Results

Round 1

Round 2

Round 3

Round 4

Round 5

Round 6 

Source:

Ladder 

Note: (C) = Champions

Source:

RLI Championship 
Three teams contested the RLI Championship, with the Banbridge Broncos taking the title back to Northern Ireland with a perfect record.

Teams

Results

Round 1

Round 2

Round 3

Round 4

Round 5

Round 6 

Source:

Ladder 

Note: (C) = Champions

Source:

RLI Women's Premiership 
The RLI Women's Premiership was held as a two game series between Galway and Dublin City.

Teams

Results

Game 1

Game 2

References 

2022 in rugby league
2022 in Irish sport
Rugby league in Ireland